Flavius Latinus (died 115) was a Christian martyr of the persecutions of Trajan.

He is said to be the third bishop of Brescia, successor to Saint Viator. This tradition is, however, questioned. Viator of Bergamo is a much later figure, and 
the reference to his earlier being a bishop of Brescia is doubted. The historical list of bishops of Brescia is not established so far back as the early persecutions in the 2nd century.

He is a Catholic and Orthodox saint, feast day March 24.

Notes

115 deaths
2nd-century Christian saints
Year of birth unknown